Cadet grey (sometimes spelled cadet gray in parts of the United States) is a somewhat blue-greyish shade of the color grey. The first recorded use of cadet grey as a color name in English was in 1912.  Before 1912, the word cadet grey was used as a name for a type of military issue uniform.

Variations

Space cadet

Displayed at right is the color space cadet.

Space cadet is one of the colors on the Resene Color List, a color list widely popular in Australia and New Zealand. The color "space cadet" was formulated in 2007.

Cadet blue

Displayed at right is the grayish blue web color cadet blue.

The first recorded use of cadet blue as a color name in English was in 1892.

In 1987, cadet blue was formulated as one of the X11 colors, which in the early 1990s became known as the X11 web colors.

Star command blue

Displayed at right is the color star command blue.

This color was apparently formulated as an impression of the color that commissioned officers in a fictional space navy would wear.

Cadet

Displayed at right is the color cadet, a dark shade of cadet grey.

The first recorded use of cadet as a color name in English was in 1915.

Military use 

The name cadet grey stems from its use in uniforms of the United States Army, in particular, cadets at the United States Military Academy at West Point, New York.

Both armies in the American Civil War initially included uniforms in the color, including the 7th New York Militia, but it was primarily identified with those of the Confederate States of America. By 1863, all troops were asked to obey the Regulations for the Confederate States Army and have cadet grey uniforms. The lack of a formal uniform at the beginning of the war, with some Confederates wearing blue and some U.S.-allied state militias still wearing gray, caused significant confusion for both sides in the First Battle of Manassas.

Cadet grey was previously chosen for the Army of the Republic of Texas in 1835 and 1840.

Under the name "pike grey" (Hechtgrau) this color distinguished the jäger regiments of the Austrian (and subsequently Austro-Hungarian) armies from 1801 until 1915. In 1908 it was adopted as the universal color of the new field service uniform for the army as a whole.

See also
Uniforms of the Confederate States military forces
List of colors

References 

Shades of gray